All Night Long is an album by the Prestige All Stars, later credited to guitarist Kenny Burrell, recorded in 1956 and released on the Prestige label.

Reception

Scott Yanow of Allmusic reviewed the album, stating: "Two of guitarist Kenny Burrell's best sessions from the 1950s were this release and its companion, All Day Long. Burrell is teamed with an impressive group of young all-stars... fortunately, all of the musicians sound quite inspired, making this an easily recommended set."

Track listing 
 "All Night Long" (Kenny Burrell) – 17:10     
 "Boo-Lu" (Hank Mobley) – 6:44     
 "Flickers" (Mal Waldron) – 6:10     
 "Li'l Hankie" (Hank Mobley) – 8:20 

Bonus tracks on CD reissue in 1990:    
"Body and Soul" (Frank Eyton, Johnny Green, Edward Heyman, Robert Sour) – 10:20     
 "Tune Up" (Miles Davis) – 5:36

Personnel 
Kenny Burrell – guitar
Donald Byrd – trumpet 
Hank Mobley – tenor saxophone 
Jerome Richardson – flute, tenor saxophone 
Mal Waldron – piano
Doug Watkins – bass
Art Taylor – drums

Production
Bob Weinstock – supervisor
Rudy Van Gelder – engineer

References 

Kenny Burrell albums
1957 albums
Prestige Records albums
Albums produced by Bob Weinstock
Albums recorded at Van Gelder Studio